Hassan Abdillahi "Karate" is a Somali journalist and social activist. He is the founder and President of Ogaal Radio.

Biography
Abdi hails from the Ogaden Darod clan.

Nicknamed "Karate", he is the founder and President of the Toronto-based Ogaal Radio (88.9FM), the largest Somali community radio station in Canada.

Abdillahi has also played an active supporting role in the formation of the autonomous Jubaland state in southern Somalia, which was officialized in 2013.

Awards

In November 2009, Abdillahi was presented with a National Ethnic Press and Media Council of Canada (NEPMCC) award by Prime Minister Stephen Harper at an event in Seneca College.

See also
Hodan Nalayeh

Notes

External links
Radio Ogaal

Living people
Ethnic Somali people
Somalian emigrants to Canada
Somalian journalists
Year of birth missing (living people)
Ogaden (clan)